Bezuderzhny was a  of the Soviet and later Russian navy. She was renamed to Gremyashchy in 2007.

Development and design 

The project began in the late 1960s when it was becoming obvious to the Soviet Navy that naval guns still had an important role particularly in support of amphibious landings, but existing gun cruisers and destroyers were showing their age. A new design was started, employing a new 130 mm automatic gun turret.

Construction and career 
Bezuderzhny was laid down on 24 February 1987 and launched on 30 September 1989 by Severnaya Verf in Leningrad. She was commissioned on 25 June 1991.

In 1998 the ship was put into reserve awaiting repairs, having last gone to sea in 1997.

She was renamed to Gremyashchy in 2007.

She was finally decommissioned on 1 December 2012, and the naval flag was lowered on her.

In April 2016, the Russian Ministry of Defence officially requested bids for a contract for the scrapping of Gremyashchy along with seven other naval vessels.

References 

1989 ships
Ships of the Soviet Union
Ships built at Severnaya Verf
Naval ships of the Soviet Union
Sovremenny-class destroyers